Renée Schuurman Haygarth (née Schuurman; 26 October 1939 – 30 May 2001) was a South African tennis player who won five Grand Slam women's doubles titles and one Grand Slam mixed doubles title.

Biography

Schuurman teamed up with fellow South African Sandra Reynolds to win four Grand Slam women's doubles titles. They won the 1959 Australian Championships and the 1959, 1961, and 1962 French Championships. In addition, they were the runners-up at Wimbledon in 1960 and 1962. Schuurman won her other Grand Slam women's doubles title with Ann Haydon-Jones at the 1963 French Championships. They defeated Margaret Court and Robyn Ebbern in the final.

In April 1962, she defeated Angela Mortimer in the final of the British Hard Court Championships.

Schuurman and Bob Howe won the mixed doubles title at the 1962 French Championships. She and Rod Laver were twice the runners-up in Grand Slam mixed doubles tournaments, at the 1959 Australian and French Championships. Her best Grand Slam singles result was when she reached the final at the 1959 Australian Championships, losing to Mary Carter Reitano 6–2, 6–3. Schuurman won the German Championships in 1963, defeating Lesley Turner in the final in three sets.

According to Lance Tingay of The Daily Telegraph and the Daily Mail, Schuurman was ranked in the world top 10 from 1960 through 1963, reaching a career high of World No. 8 in those rankings in 1963.

She married Peter Haygarth on 29 May 1964 in Durban. Her second marriage, to Robin Osborne, took place in 1977.

Grand Slam finals

Singles (1 runner-up)

Doubles (5 titles, 2 runner-ups)

Mixed doubles (1 title, 2 runners-up)

Grand Slam singles tournament timeline

See also 

 Performance timelines for all female tennis players who reached at least one Grand Slam final

References

External links

 
 

South African female tennis players
1939 births
2001 deaths
Sportspeople from Durban
Grand Slam (tennis) champions in women's doubles
Grand Slam (tennis) champions in mixed doubles
Australian Championships (tennis) champions
French Championships (tennis) champions